Cornelius Neale (12 August 1789 – February 1823, Chiswick) was an English clergyman.

Life
Neale came from a London family with an Evangelical background: his father James Neale was one of the founders of the London Missionary Society.  He entered St John's College, Cambridge and graduated Senior Wrangler in 1812, with first Smith's Prize and the second Chancellor's medal. He was elected a fellow of his college.

He was ordained and took a curacy in Leicester.  He died of consumption in February 1823.

Private life
In 1816 he married Susannah, daughter of John Mason Good: they had a son, John Mason Neale and a daughter Elizabeth Neale who founded an order of nuns.

References

 Michael Chandler, The Life and Work of John Mason Neale, Gracewing (Jul 1995) . pp. 3–4
 Olinthus Gregory, Charles Jerram, Memoirs of the Life, Writings, and Character, Literary, Professional, and Religious of the late John Mason Good MD, Crocker and Brewster, Boston, Mass. (1829). pp. 256–259
 William Jowett, Memoir of the Rev. Cornelius Neale (2nd edition, 1835)

External links
William Jowett's Memoir of the Rev. Cornelius Neale M.A. (2nd edition, 1835) - full text online at google.com

1789 births
1823 deaths
Alumni of St John's College, Cambridge
Fellows of St John's College, Cambridge
19th-century English Anglican priests
Evangelical Anglican clergy
Senior Wranglers